Pete Thomas is a British music producer, TV and film composer, recording musician, and saxophonist. He was born in London and is based in Southampton, England.

Career

Thomas studied saxophone at Leeds College of Music, obtaining a first class diploma. He has worked as head of jazz and pop performance at University of Southampton, where he also taught saxophone and composition. He had one of his first professional gigs with Fats Domino. This led to working with Joe Jackson on his Jumpin' Jive album and world tours, as saxophonist and co-arranger. He composed music for Blue Ice featuring Michael Caine, Monkey Business for Meridian TV and American Kickboxer II. His work has also been featured in the video game Fallout New Vegas. He has also worked with Bill Haley & His Comets, Elton John, PJ Harvey, The Proclaimers, R.E.M., Cliff Richard, Dave Stewart, Richard Thompson, Kim Wilde, and Jimmy Witherspoon.

Discography
 Mr. Lucky

References

External links
 Official website

Living people
Year of birth missing (living people)
21st-century British male musicians
21st-century saxophonists
Academics of the University of Southampton
Alumni of Leeds College of Music
British male saxophonists
English film score composers
English male film score composers
English male composers
English rock saxophonists
English jazz saxophonists
English classical saxophonists
English television composers